Brachiozoa is a grouping of lophophorate animals including Brachiopoda and Phoronida. It also includes their ancestors, the extinct tommotiids.

References

Lophophorata
Protostome unranked clades